Tru Love is a 2013 Canadian drama film written, directed and produced by Kate Johnston and Shauna MacDonald.

Plot 
Tru Richmond (Shauna MacDonald) is a 37-year-old serial bed-hopping lesbian who cannot commit to a relationship or a job for long. Restless by nature and wounded by the past, she seems to live from pillar to post, from mattress to mattress, bobbing along through life with no anchor to ground her. She gets by on her wits, her considerable good looks, and charm — but at her age, it is all starting to wear a little thin.

Tru meets Alice Beacon (Kate Trotter), a 60-year-old widow who is in town to visit her daughter Suzanne (Christine Horne), a 25-year-old perenially-busy corporate lawyer, who is Tru's friend.

When Tru meets Alice, sparks fly and Alice and Tru begin forging an unlikely friendship. Suzanne, who has a deeply conflicted relationship with her mother and a complicated and secret past with Tru, becomes increasingly alarmed at the growing bond between Tru and Alice.

After Suzanne witnesses an intimate moment between the two, feeling jealous and threatened, she tries to sabotage the budding romance only for it to backfire.

Cast

Release and reception 
Tru Love was distributed in Canada by IndieCan Entertainment, and internationally by Wolfe Releasing. It was released as VOD on October 7, 2014, and on DVD by Wolfe Video on November 4, 2014.

At the 2014 Inside Out Film and Video Festival, the film won the Audience Award, and MacDonald and Johnston both jointly won the Emerging Artist Award. At the 3rd Canadian Screen Awards in 2015, Patric Caird and Sonya Côté were nominated for Best Original Song, for "Danse Elegant".

See also
 List of LGBT films directed by women

References

External links
 
 

2013 films
2013 drama films
2013 LGBT-related films
Canadian drama films
Canadian LGBT-related films
English-language Canadian films
LGBT-related drama films
Lesbian-related films
2010s English-language films
2010s Canadian films